The de Havilland DH.80A Puss Moth is a British three-seater high-wing monoplane aeroplane designed and built by the de Havilland Aircraft Company between 1929 and 1933. It flew at a speed approaching 124 mph (200 km/h), making it one of the highest-performance private aircraft of its era.

Design history
The unnamed DH.80 prototype which first flew in September 1929 was designed for the flourishing private flying movement in the United Kingdom. It was a streamlined all-wooden aircraft fitted with the new de Havilland Gipsy III inverted inline engine that gave unimpeded vision across the nose without the protruding cylinder heads of the earlier Gipsy II engine.

After the prototype was tested, the aircraft was redesigned with a fabric-covered steel-tube fuselage and as such redesignated the DH.80A Puss Moth. The first production aircraft flew in March 1930 and was promptly sent on a sales tour of Australia and New Zealand. Orders came quickly, and in the three years of production ending in March 1933, 259 were manufactured in England. An additional 25 aircraft were built by de Havilland Canada. Most were fitted with the 130 hp (97 kW) Gipsy Major engine that gave slightly better performance.

The Puss Moth was replaced on the production line by the de Havilland DH.85 Leopard Moth that, with a plywood fuselage, was both cheaper to build, and lighter weight. Being lighter, the Leopard Moth had better performance on the same rather modest 130 hp (97 kW) Gipsy Major engine.

Technical faults
Early in its career, the DH.80A was plagued by a series of fatal crashes, the most famous being to Australian aviator Bert Hinkler while crossing the Alps in CF-APK on 7 January 1933. The cause was eventually pinned down to "flutter" caused by turbulence leading to wing failure – this was corrected by stiffening the front strut with a jury strut to the rear wing root fitting. One aircraft took part in the Challenge 1934 European tourist plane contest, but dropped out because of an engine fault on one of the last stages.

Operational history
Most DH.80As were used as private aircraft, though many also flew commercially with small air charter firms for passenger and mail carrying. Seating was normally two although in commercial use two passengers could be carried in slightly staggered seats with the rear passenger's legs beside the forward passenger seat. The wings folded backwards for storage, pivoting on the rear spar root fitting and the V-strut root fitting, a system used on other De Havilland light airplanes of the period.

Surviving British civilian aircraft were impressed into service during the Second World War to act as communication aircraft. A few survive into the early 21st century.

Record breaking flights
During the early 1930s, DH.80s were used for a number of record breaking flights. In early 1931, Nevill Vintcent made the first flight from England to Ceylon in G-AAXJ. On 25 May 1931 Capt James Douglas Mail flew in his Puss Moth G–ABIU named Baby Tank from Croydon to Bulawayo, taking 8 days according to his logbook via Pisa to Rome then on to north Africa and down the east coast, arriving 8 days later. Total flying time was 73hrs 50mins.

In July and August 1931 Amy Johnson made an eight-day flight with her co-pilot, Jack Humphreys, to Moscow and Tokyo in G-AAZV, named Jason II, completing the leg to Moscow in one day.

Late in 1931, the Australian Bert Hinkler piloted the Canadian-built CF-APK on a series of important flights including New York City to Jamaica, Jamaica to Venezuela, and a 22-hour, west-east crossing of the South Atlantic, only the second solo transatlantic crossing.

In November 1931, the 19-year-old Peggy Salaman set out in G-ABEH named Good Hope, to beat the record for the flight from London to Cape Town. She succeeded in arriving in Cape Town at 5.40 a.m. with Gordon Store, her co-pilot and navigator, beating the previous record set up by Glen Kidston by more than one day.

Most famous of the record breaking Puss Moths was Jim Mollison's G-ABXY, The Heart's Content which completed the first solo east-west Atlantic crossing in August 1932 from Portmarnock Strand near Dublin to New Brunswick, Canada and the first east-west crossing of the South Atlantic from Lympne Aerodrome to Natal, Brazil in February 1933. His wife, Amy Johnson, made record flights between England and Cape Town using G-ACAB, Desert Cloud in 1932. C. J. Melrose flew VH-UQO, named My Hildegarde in the 1934 MacRobertson Air Race. They finished overall seventh and second on handicap in a time of 10 days 16 hours.

Accidents and incidents
 On 5 May 1931, English aviator Glen Kidston was killed when his Puss Moth broke up in mid-air while flying through a dust storm over the Drakensberg escarpment of South Africa.
 On 27 July 1932, Puss Moth G-ABDH, owned by Brian Lewis and Company and piloted by Bruce Bossom, son of politician Alfred Bossom, encountered thundery weather and turbulence en route from Heston to Hamble. The plane broke up in mid air and crashed near Hindhead, killing all three occupants.
 On 18 September 1932, Puss Moth VH-UPM of New England Airways crashed at Byron Bay, New South Wales, while travelling from Sydney to Brisbane. Three people were killed, including World War I fighter ace Les Holden (travelling as a passenger).
 On 20 July 1936 a Puss Moth crashed on takeoff at La Marina Boca do Inferno near Cascaes in Portugal killing General Jose Sanjurjo Sacanell who was travelling to Spain to assume command of the Nationalists in the civil war. The pilot, Spanish playboy and aviator Juan Antonio Ansaldo, survived the crash.
 On 19 January 1937, Puss Moth VH-UPQ of North Queensland Airways crashed into the sea on approach to Cairns, Queensland, en route from Cooktown. One person was killed and two badly injured.
 On 27 August 1941, an Air Lines of Australia Puss Moth crashed in the Coen River near Coen, Queensland, while flying from Thursday Island to Cairns. Three people were killed, including former Australian senator Charles Hardy.

Variants
 de Havilland DH.80 : Prototype, 120 hp (89 kW) Gipsy III engine.
 de Havilland DH.80A Puss Moth : Two- or three-seat light aircraft, mostly with 130 hp (97 kW) Gipsy Major engine.

Operators

Air Lines of Australia
Marshalls Airways
New England Airways
North Queensland Airways

Force Publique

Royal Canadian Air Force

Air Force of the Independent State of Croatia

Luftwaffe (small numbers)

Air India

Iraqi Air Force 

Royal New Zealand Air Force
No. 42 Squadron RNZAF

South African Air Force
Union Airways

LAPE

Spanish Air Force

Aberdeen Airways
Air Commerce
Air Taxis
Birkett Air Service
British Air Navigation
East Anglian Flying Services
Hillman's Airways
Royal Air Force
No. 510 Squadron RAF
Royal Navy 1 aircraft impressed

United States Navy One used by the United States Embassy in London.

Aeroput

Specifications (DH.80)

See also

References

Notes

Bibliography

 Jackson, A.J. British Civil Aircraft, 1919–1972: Volume II.  London: Putnam (Conway Maritime Press), 1988.
 Jackson, A.J. British Civil Aircraft since 1919 (Volume 2). London: Putnam, 1974. .
 Ketley, Barry and Mark Rolfe. Luftwaffe Fledglings 1935–1945: Luftwaffe Training Units and their Aircraft. Aldershot, UK: Hikoki Publications, 1996. .

 Seth, Pran Nath and Sushma Seth Bhat  An Introduction to Travel and Tourism.  New Delhi, India: Sterling Publishers Pvt. Ltd., 2005. .

External links

The de Havilland Moth Club

High-wing aircraft
Single-engined tractor aircraft
1920s British civil utility aircraft
1920s British sport aircraft
Puss Moth
Aircraft first flown in 1929